Moises Padilla, officially the Municipality of Moises Padilla, is a 3rd class municipality in the province of Negros Occidental, Philippines. According to the 2020 census, it has a population of 43,462 people.

Formerly known as Magallon, it is famous for its vast livestock yard, the major source of income of the town. Traders all over the island of Negros come to buy, sell, and trade a variety of farm and dairy animals. The town's official emblem shows the "Carabao" or the Water buffalo.

History
Three miles north from the town is a small sitio called Magallon Cadre. Here lie the ruins of field hospital of the U.S. Army and USAFFE before the World War II.
Magallon had witnessed the brutality and terror of World War II. However no event was ever recorded in public documents. It is believed and verified by older citizens that the opening attack of Japanese invaders were sending the two well-armed Mitsubishi Zero fighters. The Japanese commander had chosen cleverly to initiate the attack during the market day of the Magallon which is every Tuesdays; where the large population gathered and met to buy food, clothing, farm tools, and everything of value. According to witnesses, the two Japanese Zero fighters began their low level flight from Crossing Magallon all the way to the heart of Magallon that have a distance of about 7 kilometers. They strafed anything that moved in the road: people, children, and animals of all kinds. They finally dropped their two lethal cargoes of bombs right in the center of the market. After recovering from initial shock, the Japanese infantry began pouring in from every direction of the barangay.

In 1951, the barrios of Magallon, Odiong and Guinpanaan, then belonging to the town of Isabela, were separated to form the town of Magallon. The boundary between the two towns were as surveyed by the Bureau of lands in accordance with Resolution No. 1. of the joint session of the Provincial Board of Negros Occidental and the Municipal Council of Isabela dated November 15, 1949, and subsequently concurred to by Resolution No. 79 of the Municipal Council of Isabela dated December 26, 1949.

In 1957, the town was renamed to Moises Padilla, a public figure who was tortured and killed for political reasons by assassins of former Governor Rafael Lacson in Negros Island. Padilla was declared a martyr by the late Ramon Magsaysay, then a Secretary of National Defense during the early 1950s. It was believed that Moises Padilla was an ardent supporter of Magsaysay in every political arena after the war.

Geography
Moises Padilla is situated in central part of Negros Island. The location of the town provides a good view of the Kanlaon Volcano in its near perfect cone shape. Along the east side part of the town is the longest river in Negros Island, the Binalbagan River.

The town a natural spring in the heart of the town. Large concrete storage tanks were constructed to store the clean and fresh water. No mechanical device is needed to extract the water.

Barangays
Moises Padilla is politically subdivided into 15 barangays.

Climate

Demographics

Hiligaynon is the main language of Moises Padilla followed by Cebuano. Tagalog and English are also used.

Majority of the people in the municipality are Christians.

Economy 

Sugarcane, rice, corn, root crops, lumber, and livestock are the main produce of the town.

Transportation 
Regular trips of bus and other utility vehicles to and from Bacolod, Canlaon in Negros Oriental, and Cebu City.

See also
List of renamed cities and municipalities in the Philippines

References

External links
 [ Philippine Standard Geographic Code]
Philippine Census Information
Local Governance Performance Management System

Municipalities of Negros Occidental